Recollection: The Best of Concrete Blonde is a best-of collection by alternative rock band Concrete Blonde, released in 1996.

Critical reception
Entertainment Weekly wrote that "Johnette Napolitano’s robust vocal delivery (a slightly bronchial Chrissie Hynde) makes everything here sound like party music for pale people who own a lot of black clothes."

Track listing

Personnel
Johnette Napolitano - vocals, bass

References

Concrete Blonde albums
1996 greatest hits albums
I.R.S. Records compilation albums